Tony Smith (born 28 October 1973 in Bellshill) is a Scottish footballer, who played as a left back.

Honours
Airdrieonians
Scottish Challenge Cup: 1994–95

See also
Dundee United F.C. season 1999-00
Dundee United F.C. season 2000-01

References

External links

1973 births
Living people
Scottish footballers
Heart of Midlothian F.C. players
Airdrieonians F.C. (1878) players
Dundee United F.C. players
Berwick Rangers F.C. players
Stenhousemuir F.C. players
Scottish Premier League players
Bathgate Thistle F.C. players
Scottish Football League players
Scottish football managers
Stenhousemuir F.C. managers
Scottish Football League managers
Association football fullbacks